The oldest McDonald's restaurant is a drive-up hamburger stand at 10207 Lakewood Boulevard at Florence Avenue in Downey, California. It was the third McDonald's restaurant and opened on August 18, 1953. It was also the second restaurant franchised by Richard and Maurice McDonald, prior to the involvement of Ray Kroc in the company. The restaurant is the oldest one in the chain still in existence and is one of Downey's main tourist attractions. Along with its sign, it was deemed eligible for addition to the National Register of Historic Places in 1984, although it was not added at the time because the owner objected.

History

The McDonald brothers opened their first restaurant adjacent to the Monrovia Airport in 1937.  It was a tiny octagonal building informally called The Airdrome. That octagonal building was later moved to 1398 North E Street in San Bernardino, California in 1940. It was originally a barbecue drive-in, but the brothers discovered that most of their profits came from hamburgers. In 1948, they closed their restaurant for three months, reopening it in December as a walk-up hamburger stand that sold hamburgers, potato chips, and orange juice; the following year, french fries and Coca-Cola were added to the menu. This simplified menu, and food preparation using assembly line principles, allowed them to sell hamburgers for 15 cents, or about half as much as at a sit-down restaurant. The restaurant was very successful, and the brothers started to franchise the concept in 1953.

The first franchisee was Occidental Petroleum executive Neil Fox, who opened a restaurant at 4050 North Central Avenue in Phoenix, Arizona in May, for a flat fee of $1,000. His restaurant was the first to employ the McDonald brothers' Golden Arches standardized design, created by Southern California architect Stanley Clark Meston and his assistant Charles Fish. Fox's use of the "McDonald's" name evidently came as a surprise to the brothers. (Two of their franchises, in North Hollywood and Azusa, would use the name "Peak's," but all others would be "McDonald's".)

Fox's brother-in-law Roger Williams and his business partner Burdette "Bud" Landon, were the franchisees. They used their expertise in siting Occidental gasoline stations in choosing the location. Like the McDonald brothers' other franchisees, they were required to use Meston's design.

The purchase of the chain from the McDonald brothers by Ray Kroc did not affect the Downey restaurant, as it was franchised under an agreement with the McDonald brothers, not with Kroc's company McDonald's Systems, Inc., which later became McDonald's Corporation. As a result, the restaurant was not subject to the modernization requirements that McDonald's Corporation placed on its franchisees. Its menu came to differ from that of other McDonald's restaurants, and lacked items such as the Big Mac that were developed in the corporation. In part due to these differences, as well as a corporate McDonald's opening in the mid-1970s less than half a mile away, the restaurant suffered from poor sales, and was eventually acquired by McDonald's Corporation in 1990, when it was the only remaining McDonald's that was independent of the chain.

With low sales, damage from the 1994 Northridge earthquake, and the lack of a drive-up window and indoor seating, the restaurant was closed, and McDonald's planned to demolish it and incorporate some of its features in a modern "retro" restaurant nearby. However, it was listed on the National Trust for Historic Preservation's 1994 list of the 11 Most Endangered Historic Places. With both the public and preservationists demanding the restaurant be saved, McDonald's spent two years restoring the restaurant and reopened it. Customers can visit the restored restaurant and an adjoining gift shop and museum.

Other early McDonald's restaurants

Very few early McDonald's restaurants remain, largely because McDonald's Corporation required its franchisees to update their buildings. The original hexagonal McDonald's hamburger stand in San Bernardino was demolished in 1953 to be replaced by a building in the now familiar Golden Arches style; in an oversight, the McDonald brothers failed to retain rights to the McDonald's name when they sold the chain to Kroc, and were forced to rename it "The Big M". It went out of business and was demolished in 1972, although part of the sign remains; an independent McDonald's museum was opened on the site in 1998.

Other early buildings still standing include the seventh McDonald's, at 1057 East Mission Boulevard in Pomona, California, which is now a doughnut shop (currently the second-oldest existing McDonald's building). The 11th McDonald's at 1900 South Central Avenue in Los Angeles, (later a taco restaurant), was demolished in 2016. Kroc's 1955 McDonald's franchise in Des Plaines, Illinois, the ninth in the chain, was demolished in 1984, but a replica was built on the original foundation and was described as the McDonald's No. 1 Store Museum. It was torn down, with the sign removed in January 2018.

A single-arch McDonald's sign at 2801 S. Olive Street, Pine Bluff, Arkansas, dating from 1962, was added to the National Register of Historic Places in 2006.

A restaurant built in 1962 at 2434 Almaden Road in San Jose, California, is the only other remaining early McDonald's still in operation in the state, although a modern restaurant is now attached to it. This location is listed as one of the city's historic resources.<ref
name=SanJose></ref>

An early McDonald's stood at 9100 SE Powell Boulevard in Portland, Oregon, on Southeast 91st Avenue and Powell Boulevard. It was not attached to the adjacent McDonald's but was available for party rentals. It was demolished on February 22, 2018, to be replaced by a new McDonald's with self-service kiosks.

The site of the original McDonald's on 1398 North E Street in San Bernardino was purchased in 1998 by Albert Okura, owner of the Juan Pollo chicken restaurant chain, for $135,000 in a foreclosure sale. Okura turned the property into the headquarters for his chain of restaurants and opened an unofficial McDonald's museum on the site, which, due to communications with McDonald's, Okura refers to as the "historic site of the original McDonald's". Okura said though he did not intend to open the museum, an erroneous news story that mentioned he was planning on opening a museum gave him the idea; former employees and customers sent the museum many of the items on display.

Gallery

See also
 List of hamburger restaurants

References

External links
Official Restaurant Website

McDonald's buildings and structures
Googie architecture in California
Museums in Los Angeles County, California
Food museums in the United States
Oldest things
Restaurants established in 1953
1953 establishments in California
Downey, California
Commercial buildings completed in 1953